Wisteria is an album by guitarist Jimmy Raney featuring Tommy Flanagan, recorded in 1985 and released on the Dutch label, Criss Cross Jazz. The CD rerelease added one additional track recorded in 1990.

Reception 

Scott Yanow of AllMusic states "The interplay between the three musicians is impressive, and the subtle creativity makes repeated listenings of the modern mainstream music quite valuable. Recommended".

Track listing 
 "Hassan's Dream" (Benny Golson) – 7:18
 "Wisteria" (George Mraz) – 5:32
 "Ovals" (Jimmy Raney) – 6:25
 "Out of the Past" (Golson) – 7:04
 "I Could Write a Book" (Richard Rodgers, Lorenz Hart) – 6:17
 "Ev'rything I Love" (Cole Porter) – 7:04
 "All the Things You Are" (Jerome Kern, Oscar Hammerstein II) – 7:18  Bonus track on CD release

Personnel 
Jimmy Raney – guitar
Tommy Flanagan – piano
George Mraz – bass

References 

Jimmy Raney albums
1986 albums
Criss Cross Jazz albums
Albums recorded at Van Gelder Studio